Julia Roberts (born 1967) is an American actress.

Julia Roberts may also refer to:

 Julia Roberts (soccer) (born 1991), American professional soccer midfielder
 Julia Roberts (television presenter) (born 1956), British television home shopping host
 Julia Link Roberts, American educator

See also
Julie Roberts (born 1979), American country music singer
Juliet Roberts (born 1962), British jazz, rock soul and house music singer songwriter